Åland elects on a regional level a legislature. The diet (Lagtinget) has 30 members, elected for a four-year term by proportional representation.
Åland has a multi-party system, with numerous parties in which no one party often has a chance of gaining power alone, and parties must work with each other to form coalition governments.

See also
 Elections in Finland: Åland legislative election
 Electoral calendar
 Electoral system

External links
Parties and Elections in Europe
Legislative Assembly elections